Supper-time may refer to:

 Supper, the meal concept
 "Supper Time", the 1933 song by Irving Berlin
 "Suppertime" (or "Supper-Time"), a song written by Ira Stanphill and released in 1953 by Jimmie Davis with Anita Kerr Singers.
 Suppertime, an unreleased album by rapper Static Major
 Suppertime, an Australian food delivery service acquired by Delivery Hero and rebranded Foodora